Saliva (commonly referred to as spit) is an extracellular fluid produced and secreted by salivary glands in the mouth. In humans, saliva is around 99% water, plus electrolytes, mucus, white blood cells, epithelial cells (from which DNA can be extracted), enzymes (such as lipase and amylase), antimicrobial agents (such as secretory IgA, and lysozymes).

The enzymes found in saliva are essential in beginning the process of digestion of dietary starches and fats. These enzymes also play a role in breaking down food particles entrapped within dental crevices, thus protecting teeth from bacterial decay. Saliva also performs a lubricating function, wetting food and permitting the initiation of swallowing, and protecting the oral mucosa from drying out.

Various animal species have special uses for saliva that go beyond predigestion. Some swifts use their gummy saliva to build nests. Aerodramus nests form the basis of bird's nest soup.
Cobras, vipers, and certain other members of the venom clade hunt with venomous saliva injected by fangs. Some caterpillars produce silk fiber from silk proteins stored in modified salivary glands (which are unrelated to the vertebrate ones).

Composition
Produced in salivary glands, human saliva comprises 99.5% water, but also contains many important substances, including electrolytes, mucus, antibacterial compounds and various enzymes.  Medically, constituents of saliva can noninvasively provide important diagnostic information related to oral and systemic diseases.

 Water: 99.5%
 Electrolytes:
 2–21 mmol/L sodium (lower than blood plasma)
 10–36 mmol/L potassium (higher than plasma)
 1.2–2.8 mmol/L calcium (similar to plasma)
 0.08–0.5 mmol/L magnesium
 5–40 mmol/L chloride (lower than plasma)
 25 mmol/L bicarbonate (higher than plasma)
 1.4–39 mmol/L phosphate
 Iodine (mmol/L concentration is usually higher than plasma, but dependent variable according to dietary iodine intake)
 Mucus (mucus in saliva mainly consists of mucopolysaccharides and glycoproteins)
 Antibacterial compounds (thiocyanate, hydrogen peroxide, and secretory immunoglobulin A)
 Epidermal growth factor (EGF)
 Saliva eliminates caesium, which can substitute for potassium in the cells. 
 Various enzymes; most notably:
 α-amylase (EC3.2.1.1), or ptyalin, secreted by the acinar cells of the parotid and submandibular glands, starts the digestion of starch before the food is even swallowed; it has a pH optimum of 7.4
 Lingual lipase, which is secreted by the acinar cells of the sublingual gland; has a pH optimum around 4.0 so it is not activated until entering the acidic environment of the stomach
Kallikrein, an enzyme that proteolytically cleaves high-molecular-weight kininogen to produce bradykinin, which is a vasodilator; it is secreted by the acinar cells of all three major salivary glands
 Antimicrobial enzymes that kill bacteria:
Lysozyme
Salivary lactoperoxidase
Lactoferrin
Immunoglobulin A
Proline-rich proteins (function in enamel formation, Ca2+-binding, microbe killing and lubrication)
 Minor enzymes including: salivary acid phosphatases A+B, N-acetylmuramoyl-L-alanine amidase, NAD(P)H dehydrogenase (quinone), superoxide dismutase, glutathione transferase, class 3 aldehyde dehydrogenase, glucose-6-phosphate isomerase, and tissue kallikrein (function unknown)
 Cells: possibly as many as 8 million human and 500 million bacterial cells per mL. The presence of bacterial products (small organic acids, amines, and thiols) causes saliva to sometimes exhibit a foul odor.
 Opiorphin, a pain-killing substance found in human saliva
 Haptocorrin, a protein which binds to vitamin B12 to protect it against degradation in the stomach, before it binds to intrinsic factor.

Daily salivary output
Experts debate the amount of saliva that a healthy person produces. Production is estimated at 1500ml per day and researchers generally accept that during sleep the amount drops significantly.
In humans, the submandibular gland contributes around 70 to 75% of secretions, while the parotid gland secretes about 20 to 25%; small amounts are secreted from the other salivary glands.

Functions
Saliva contributes to the digestion of food and to the maintenance of oral hygiene. Without normal salivary function the frequency of dental caries, gum disease (gingivitis and periodontitis), and other oral problems increases significantly. Saliva limits the growth of bacterial pathogens and is a major factor in sustaining systemic and oral health through the prevention of tooth decay and the removal of sugars and other food sources for microbes.

Lubricant
Saliva coats the oral mucosa mechanically protecting it from trauma during eating, swallowing, and speaking. Mouth soreness is very common in people with reduced saliva (xerostomia) and food (especially dry food) sticks to the inside of the mouth.

Digestion
The digestive functions of saliva include moistening food and helping to create a food bolus. The lubricative function of saliva allows the food bolus to be passed easily from the mouth into the esophagus. Saliva contains the enzyme amylase, also called ptyalin, which is capable of breaking down starch into simpler sugars such as maltose and dextrin that can be further broken down in the small intestine. About 30% of starch digestion takes place in the mouth cavity. Salivary glands also secrete salivary lipase (a more potent form of lipase) to begin fat digestion. Salivary lipase plays a large role in fat digestion in newborn infants as their pancreatic lipase still needs some time to develop.

Role in taste
Saliva is very important in the sense of taste. It is the liquid medium in which chemicals are carried to taste receptor cells (mostly associated with lingual papillae). People with little saliva often complain of dysgeusia (i.e. disordered taste, e.g. reduced ability to taste, or having a bad, metallic taste at all times). A rare condition identified to affect taste is that of 'Saliva Hypernatrium', or excessive amounts of sodium in saliva that is not caused by any other condition (e.g., Sjögren syndrome), causing everything to taste 'salty'.

Other
 Saliva maintains the pH of the mouth. Saliva is supersaturated with various ions. Certain salivary proteins prevent precipitation, which would form salts. These ions act as a buffer, keeping the acidity of the mouth within a certain range, typically pH 6.2–7.4. This prevents minerals in the dental hard tissues from dissolving.
 Saliva secretes carbonic anhydrase (gustin), which is thought to play a role in the development of taste buds.
 Saliva contains EGF. EGF results in cellular proliferation, differentiation, and survival.  EGF is a low-molecular-weight polypeptide first purified from the mouse submandibular gland, but since then found in many human tissues including submandibular gland, parotid gland. Salivary EGF, which seems also regulated by dietary inorganic iodine, also plays an important physiological role in the maintenance of oro-esophageal and gastric tissue integrity. The biological effects of salivary EGF include healing of oral and gastroesophageal ulcers, inhibition of gastric acid secretion, stimulation of DNA synthesis as well as mucosal protection from intraluminal injurious factors such as gastric acid, bile acids, pepsin, and trypsin and to physical, chemical and bacterial agents.

Production
The production of saliva is stimulated both by the sympathetic nervous system and the parasympathetic.

The saliva stimulated by sympathetic innervation is thicker, and saliva stimulated parasympathetically is more fluid-like.

Sympathetic stimulation of saliva is to facilitate respiration, whereas parasympathetic stimulation is to facilitate digestion.

Parasympathetic stimulation leads to acetylcholine (ACh) release onto the salivary acinar cells. ACh binds to muscarinic receptors, specifically M3, and causes an increased intracellular calcium ion concentration (through the IP3/DAG second messenger system). Increased calcium causes vesicles within the cells to fuse with the apical cell membrane leading to secretion. ACh also causes the salivary gland to release kallikrein, an enzyme that converts kininogen to lysyl-bradykinin. Lysyl-bradykinin acts upon blood vessels and capillaries of the salivary gland to generate vasodilation and increased capillary permeability, respectively. The resulting increased blood flow to the acini allows the production of more saliva. In addition, Substance P can bind to Tachykinin NK-1 receptors leading to increased intracellular calcium concentrations and subsequently increased saliva secretion. Lastly, both parasympathetic and sympathetic nervous stimulation can lead to myoepithelium contraction which causes the expulsion of secretions from the secretory acinus into the ducts and eventually to the oral cavity.

Sympathetic stimulation results in the release of norepinephrine. Norepinephrine binding to α-adrenergic receptors will cause an increase in intracellular calcium levels leading to more fluid vs. protein secretion. If norepinephrine binds β-adrenergic receptors, it will result in more protein or enzyme secretion vs. fluid secretion. Stimulation by norepinephrine initially decreases blood flow to the salivary glands due to constriction of blood vessels but this effect is overtaken by vasodilation caused by various local vasodilators.

Saliva production may also be pharmacologically stimulated by the so-called sialagogues. It can also be suppressed by the so-called antisialagogues.

Behaviour

Spitting

Spitting is the act of forcibly ejecting saliva or other substances from the mouth. In many parts of the world, it is considered rude and a social taboo, and has sometimes been outlawed. In some countries, for example, it has been outlawed for reasons of public decency and attempting to reduce the spread of disease. These laws may not strictly enforced, but in Singapore, the fine for spitting may be as high as SGD$2,000 for multiple offenses, and one can even be arrested. In China, expectoration is more socially acceptable (even if officially disapproved of or illegal), and spittoons are still a common appearance in some cultures. Some animals, even humans in some cases, use spitting as an automatic defensive maneuver. Camels are well known for doing this, though most domestic camels are trained not to.

Spitting by an infected person (for example, one with SARS-CoV-2) whose saliva contains large amounts of virus, is a health hazard to the public.

Glue to construct bird nests
Many birds in the swift family, Apodidae, produce a viscous saliva during nesting season to glue together materials to construct a nest. Two species of swifts in the genus Aerodramus build their nests using only their saliva, the base for bird's nest soup.

Wound licking
A common belief is that saliva contained in the mouth has natural disinfectants, which leads people to believe it is beneficial to "lick their wounds". Researchers at the University of Florida at Gainesville have discovered a protein called nerve growth factor (NGF) in the saliva of mice. Wounds doused with NGF healed twice as fast as untreated and unlicked wounds; therefore, saliva can help to heal wounds in some species. NGF has not been found in human saliva; however, researchers find human saliva contains such antibacterial agents as secretory mucin, IgA, lactoferrin, lysozyme and peroxidase. It has not been shown that human licking of wounds disinfects them, but licking is likely to help clean the wound by removing  larger contaminants such as dirt and may help to directly remove infective bodies by brushing them away. Therefore, licking would be a way of wiping off pathogens, useful if clean water is not available to the animal or person.

Classical conditioning

In Pavlov's experiment, dogs were conditioned to salivate in response to a ringing bell, this stimulus is associated with a meal or hunger. Salivary secretion is also associated with nausea. Saliva is usually formed in the mouth through an act called gleeking, which can be voluntary or involuntary.

Making alcoholic beverages
Some old cultures chewed grains to produce alcoholic beverages, such as chicha, kasiri or sake.

Substitutes
A number of commercially available saliva substitutes exist.

See also
Basic reproduction number
Spittle cures

References

Further reading

External links

 

 
Body fluids
Excretion